Daku H kiasina is a 1987 Bollywood action film directed by Ashok Rao starring Zeenat Aman and Rakesh Roshan in lead roles, while Roshini, Raza Murad and Joginder played other pivotal roles. Rajinikanth made an extended special appearance in this film. The music is by Usha Khanna. The film was released on 3 April 1987.

Plot
After the death of her parents, Roopa Saxena attempts to get justice, only to find that the killers have bought the law, and their influence gets them off. Roopa then turns for help to dacait Mangal Singh, and she transforms herself into Dacait Hasina, in order to avenge her parents' death.

She gives birth to a mute child. The police entrust the matter of apprehending Daku Hasina to SP Ranjit Saxena, without realizing that he is the brother of Daku Hasina, and may actually join her to avenge the death of his parents.

Cast
Zeenat Aman as Daku Hasina
Rakesh Roshan as SP Ranjit Saxena
Roshini
Raza Murad as Raja
Joginder as Durjan
Pradeep Kumar as Shamsher Singh
Ramesh Deo  as D.I.G.
Roopesh Kumar as Rana
C.S. Dubey as Lala
Chandrashekhar as MLA
Dinesh Hingoo as Munim
Rajinikanth as Mangal Singh (special appearance)
Vijay Arora as Somnath, Mangal Singh Brother (special appearance)
Abhi Bhattacharya as School Master (special appearance)

Soundtrack

References

External links
 

1987 films
1980s Hindi-language films
Indian Western (genre) films
1987 Western (genre) films